Rosalba stigmatifera is a species of beetle in the family Cerambycidae. It was described by Thomson in 1868. It is known from Panama and South America.

References

Rosalba (beetle)
Beetles described in 1868